Sallie M. Mills Johnson (born March 6, 1862) was an American author.

Biography
Sallie M. Mills was born in Sandusky, Ohio, on March 6, 1862. She was a granddaughter of Judge Isaac Mills, of New Haven, Connecticut. Her father was Gen. William H. Mills, of Sandusky.

She was educated in New York City.

Johnson was widely known as the author of Palm Branches, and numerous other books. Her compositions in verse were of a fine order.

She traveled much in the United States and in Europe.

She was a skilled musician, and, while studying in Weimar, received a signal compliment from Franz Liszt.

Sallie M. Mills married C. C. Johnson.

She moved to Denver, Colorado, where she owned much valuable real estate.

References

1862 births
People from Sandusky, Ohio
American women poets
Year of death missing
Wikipedia articles incorporating text from A Woman of the Century